Atractocarpus fitzalanii, the brown gardenia or yellow mangosteen, is a species of flowering plant in the family Rubiaceae found in tropical Queensland in Australia. The beautifully scented flowers and lush growth has seen this plant enter cultivation in subtropical gardens in Eastern Australia.

Description 
The trunk is covered by smooth grey bark. The yellowish veins and midrib are prominent on the leaf. The new growth is a bright lime green in colour. The small (2-2.5 cm or 1 inch) white fragrant flowers appear from September to November, occur singly and have five lanceolate petals around a tube. The round- or oval-shaped fruit is 3–4 cm in diameter and ripens in April to June. The fragrance of the flowers resembles that of the common gardenia, and fruit can be eaten fresh.

TaxonomyAtractocarpus fitzalanii was originally described by German naturalist and Victorian State Botanist Ferdinand von Mueller, who named it in honour of the person who first collected it, Eugene Fitzalan. It is commonly known as the brown gardenia.

Known for many years as Randia fitzalanii,Bentham, George. 1867. Flora Australiensis 3: 411, Randia fitzalani  it gained its current binomial name in 1999 with the publishing of a genus revision by botanists Christopher Puttock and Christopher Quinn.

Subspecies
Two subspecies have become widely recognised:Atractocarpus fitzalanii subsp. fitzalaniiAtractocarpus fitzalanii subsp. tenuipes Puttock the name derived from the Latin tenuis "slender", and pes'' "foot".

Distribution and habitat
The range is from far north Queensland south through to Mackay. It is found in rainforests and sheltered habitats.

Ecology
Flowers open in the afternoon, and moths then visit the plants. Birds eat the fruit.

Uses 
Its bushy lush foliage and bright new growth, fragrant flowers and edible and tasty fruit give it horticultural potential in gardens in subtropical climates. It is suited to a shady position with good drainage in gardens, or moderately to brightly lit indoor spaces.

References

External links

World Checklist of Rubiaceae
Queensland Government, native gardenia, Atractocarpus fitzalanii 
James Cook University (Smithfield Queensland), Discover Nature, Atractocarpus fitzalanii 
Forest Lodge Garden Boutique, Atractocarpus fitzalanii
 Society for Growing Australian Plants (Aitkenvale Queensland), Atractocarpus fitzalanii 

fitzalanii
Gentianales of Australia
Endemic flora of Queensland
Trees of Australia
Ornamental trees
Plants described in 1860
Taxa named by Ferdinand von Mueller
Taxa named by Christopher Francis Puttock